Mokhtar Badji Stadium, is a multi-purpose stadium in Souk Ahras, Algeria.  It is currently used mostly for football matches. The stadium has a capacity of 15,000 people.

Football venues in Algeria
Multi-purpose stadiums in Algeria
Buildings and structures in Souk Ahras Province